Aerides, known commonly as cat's-tail orchids and fox brush orchids,  is a genus belonging to the orchid family (Orchidaceae, subfamily Epidendroideae, tribe Vandeae, subtribe Aeridinae). It is a group of tropical epiphyte orchids that grow mainly in the warm lowlands of tropical Asia from India to southern China to New Guinea. They are valued in horticulture for their racemes of showy, fragrant, colorful flowers.

The name of the genus refers to the epiphytic growth habit of the species, and literally means "air-plant". The type species, Aerides odorata, was described by João de Loureiro in 1790. This genus is abbreviated Aer in the horticultural trade.

Description
The species in this genus range from small to large monopodial epiphytes, except for Aerides krabiensis, which is a lithophyte. They form pendulous racemes with many long-lasting, fragrant, waxy flowers, which are often white with purple or pink edges. Some species have purple or pink flowers, and a few have yellow. Each flower has a forward-facing spur and grows on a sharp, stout, leafy stem. The leaves are distichous, growing in two vertical rows. The leaf margins are bilobed, and the apex is emarginate. There are ligules. Morphologically, they are very similar to species in the genus Vanda.

Habitat
The genus grows in the tropics of Asia, in India, Nepal, southern China, Southeast Asia, the Philippines, and New Guinea. They flower from June to July. Temperature requirements vary from cool to warm growing depending on the species.

Cultivation
Most Aerides species are considered easy to grow. Their flowers are fragrant and long-lived, which make them popular in horticulture as cut flowers and potted plants. Aerides can be kept in hanging baskets, teak containers or net pots, which allow the roots to extend into the air. They grow best in well-drained media, such as tree fern fibers, fir bark, and sphagnum moss. They require full sunlight, warm temperatures, and water applied to the roots. The plants do not tolerate disturbance or damage of their root systems in cultivation.

The plants do not have pseudobulbs. The leaves are leathery and drought-resistant. Many of these species have a monopodial vine-like growth habit, and the plants can quickly grow large.

Species
The following species are recognized as of June 2014, all monopodial epiphytic plants except the lithophyte A. krabiense.

 Aerides augustiana Rolfe -  Philippines
 Aerides crassifolia C.S.P.Parish ex Burb. - Assam, Indochina
 Aerides crispa Lindl. - western India
 Aerides emericii  Rchb.f. - Andaman and Nicobar Islands
 Aerides falcata Lindl. & Paxton - Yunnan, Indochina
 Aerides houlletiana Rchb.f. - Indochina
 Aerides huttonii (Hook.f.) J.H.Veitch - Sulawesi
 Aerides inflexa Teijsm. & Binn. - Borneo, Sulawesi
 Aerides × jansonii Rolfe - Myanmar    (A. falcata × A. odorata)
 Aerides krabiense Seidenf. - Thailand, Peninsular Malaysia
 Aerides lawrenceae Rchb.f. - Philippines
 Aerides leeana Rchb.f. - Philippines
 Aerides macmorlandii  B.S.Williams - India
 Aerides maculosa Lindl. - India
 Aerides multiflora Roxb. - India, Himalayas, Nepal, Bhutan, Assam, Andaman Islands, Indochina 
 Aerides odorata Lour. - Yunnan, Guangdong, India, Himalayas, Bangladesh, Nepal, Andaman & Nicobar Islands, Indochina, Philippines, Malaysia, Indonesia
 Aerides orthocentra Hand.-Mazz. - Yunnan
 Aerides quinquevulnera Lindl. - Philippines, New Guinea
 Aerides ringens  (Lindl.) C.E.C.Fisch. in J.S.Gamble - India, Sri Lanka, Andaman Islands
 Aerides roebelenii  Rchb.f. - Philippines
 Aerides rosea Lodd. ex Lindl. & Paxton - Guangxi, Guizhou, Yunnan, Bhutan, Assam, India, Laos, Myanmar, Thailand, Vietnam
 Aerides rubescens  (Rolfe) Schltr. - Vietnam
 Aerides savageana A.H.Kent in H.J.Veitch - Philippines
 Aerides shibatiana Boxall ex Náves in F.M.Blanco - Philippines
 Aerides sukauensis Shim - Sabah
 Aerides thibautiana Rchb.f. - Sulawesi
 Aerides timorana Miq. - Timor† (apparently extinct; not collected since 1849)

Hybrids
Natural hybrids include Aerides × jansonii, a cross between Aerides falcata and Aerides odorata.

Many hybrids have been made between Aerides and other orchids. The horticultural specimen × Christieara is a three-way hybrid between Aerides, Vanda, and Ascocentrum. Hybrids come in a wide range of colors due to the high degree of genetic diversity.

References

External links

 
Vandeae genera
Epiphytes
Orchids of Asia